The 2022–23 Central Arkansas Bears basketball team represented the University of Central Arkansas (UCA) in the 2022–23 NCAA Division I men's basketball season. The Bears, led by third-year head coach Anthony Boone, played their home games at the on-campus Farris Center in Conway, Arkansas as members of the ASUN Conference. They finished the season 9–22, 4–14 in ASUN play to finish in 13th place. They failed to qualify for the ASUN tournament.

Previous season
The Bears finished the 2021–22 season 11–20, 7–9 in ASUN play to finish in third place in the West Division. In the ASUN tournament, they defeated Stetson in the first round, before losing to Jacksonville in the quarterfinals.

Roster

Schedule and results

|-
!colspan=12 style=| Exhibition

|-
!colspan=12 style=| Non-conference regular season

|-
!colspan=13 style=| ASUN Conference regular season

Source

References

Central Arkansas Bears basketball seasons
Central Arkansas
Central Arkansas Bears basketball
Central Arkansas Bears basketball